A regidor (plural: regidores) is a member of a council of municipalities in Spain and Latin America. Portugal also used to have the same office of regedor.

Mexico
In Mexico, an ayuntamiento (municipal council) is composed of a municipal president (mayor), one or two síndicos (attorney general) and several regidores who meet in cabildo (council) sessions. A regidor is the community representative (commissioner) before the municipal government.

The responsibilities of a regidor are:
 To participate in council session and administer the interests of the municipality
 To exert faculties of inspection and oversee the branches of public administration
 To obtain information from the municipal president regarding the services offered by the different dependencies

Some activities of a regidor are:
 Propose or reform of municipal regulations
 Vote on municipal affairs
 To attend a commission assigned to them
 Promote  social participation
 Propose measures for municipal development

All municipalites of Aguascalientes have five regidores and one síndico except for the capital, which has ten regidores and two síndicos.

See also
 Corregidor
 Corregimiento
 Alcalde
 Alcalde ordinario
 Sargento mayor
 Cabildo (council)
 Síndico
 Ayuntamiento
 Teniente a guerra
 Santa Hermandad

References

Spanish language
Political occupations
Medieval titles